Eberhardshof station is a Nuremberg U-Bahn station, located on the U1.

It used to be the terminus for the "booster" line U11 until 2017 when trains formerly marked "U11" and "U21" were folded into U1 and U2.

References 

Nuremberg U-Bahn stations
Railway stations in Germany opened in 1981
1981 establishments in West Germany